Teo Wan Lin (Zhang Wanlin; ; born 21 March 1984) is a Singaporean dermatologist, medical director at TWL Specialist Skin & Laser Centre and the founder of Dr.TWL Dermaceuticals, a cosmeceutical skincare line. She is also the host of a podcast Dermatologist Talks - Science of Beauty on Spotify. She is known in the media for her work in botany relating to cosmeceuticals.

Early life and education

Teo Wan Lin obtained her Bachelor of Medicine and Surgery Degree from the National University of Singapore. Afterwards, she became a medical specialist dermatologist, certified by the Specialist Accreditation Board in Singapore. She is a Fellow of the Academy of Medicine, Singapore (College of Physicians, Chapter of Dermatologists) and a Member of the Royal College of Surgeons in the United Kingdom.

She was a former national team épée fencer and she represented Singapore in multiple international and regional competitions, including the Fencing World Cup and the 2007 Summer Universiade held in Bangkok. She was formerly a model, represented by international modelling agency, AVE Management. She has been featured in several beauty editorials/advertorials including Her World, CITA BELLA, Shape, Cleo, URBAN, Style Weddings, as well as in print/commercial advertisements for Maybelline, Kosé, Fresh Kon, Tiger Beer, CapitaLand Malls, Citibank, Singtel, amongst others. She was also featured in a regional campaign for Sony Ericsson in Hong Kong in 2006.

Career

In 2019, Teo developed a custom lipstick laboratory which features an edible lipstick formula. Her concept of personalised cosmetics in a tolerable base, suitable for eczema, rosacea and sensitive skin individuals, was featured in Cosmetics Design Asia.

In 2020, she invented a fabric mask to treat acne with biofunctional textiles under Dr.TWL Biomaterials, which was featured in The Straits Times A-Z inventions of Coronavirus disease 2019. Her concept was published in the Journal of the American Academy of Dermatology in her research letter - Diagnostic and management considerations for "maskne" in the era of COVID-19, on October 1, 2020. In the same year, she founded Dr.TWL Pharmacy, a skincare e-pharmacy concept integrated with teledermatology.

Publications

She is the author of several books published on Amazon Kindle, including Skincare Bible: Dermatologist’s Tips on Cosmeceutical Skincare, Haircare Bible: Dermatologist's Tips for Haircare and Hair Loss, and Masking Up: Dermatologist’s Guide to Maskne.

Campaigns

Teo was featured in Dior's Digital Skincare Talk as a skincare expert, hosted by Gisele Bündchen and Phillip Picardi in October 2020. She has collaborated with skincare brands Clinique and Mentholatum to create scientific educational content.

In 2019, Teo was featured in the "#InCharge" campaign for Diane von Fürstenberg, in collaboration with Muse Magazine Singapore. She collaborated with Gillette Venus Sensitive Razor Campaign for their launch video as a sensitive skin expert.

References

Living people
Singaporean dermatologists
21st-century Singaporean physicians
National University of Singapore alumni
Singaporean female épée fencers
1984 births